Podstrm is a small settlement in the foothills of the Gorjanci Hills in the Municipality of Kostanjevica na Krki in eastern Slovenia. The area is part of the traditional region of Lower Carniola and is now included in the Lower Sava Statistical Region.

References

External links
Podstrm on Geopedia

Populated places in the Municipality of Kostanjevica na Krki